Greenberg: Original Motion Picture Soundtrack is the soundtrack to Noah Baumbach's film Greenberg.  It includes LCD Soundsystem musician and DFA Records co-founder James Murphy's debut film score, as well as songs by other artists.

Track listing

 Steve Miller Band: "Jet Airliner"
 James Murphy: "People"
 Nite Jewel: "Suburbia" 
 James Murphy: "Sleepy Baby"
 James Murphy: "Thumbs"
 Albert Hammond: "It Never Rains in Southern California"
 James Murphy: "Plenty of Time" 
 James Murphy: "Photographs"
 James Murphy: "Gente" 
 Galaxie 500: "Strange" 
 LCD Soundsystem: "Oh You (Christmas Blues)"
 James Murphy: "Birthday Song"
 James Murphy: "Dear You"
 The Sonics: "Shot Down"
 Duran Duran: "The Chauffeur"
 James Murphy: "If You Need a Friend"
 James Murphy : "Please Don't Follow Me"
 James Murphy: "Photographs (Piano)"

References

2010s film soundtrack albums
LCD Soundsystem albums
2010 soundtrack albums
DFA Records soundtracks